The Levi Glick Round Barn near Surrey, North Dakota, United States, is a round barn that was built in 1923 by ethnic German immigrants.  It was listed on the National Register of Historic Places in 1987.

It is "the only masonry tile round barn built in the state" and may also be associated significantly with "history of
the Mennonites, the particular North Dakota ethnic group associated with the barn."

References

Barns on the National Register of Historic Places in North Dakota
Infrastructure completed in 1923
German-American culture in North Dakota
Mennonitism in North Dakota
Round barns in North Dakota
National Register of Historic Places in Ward County, North Dakota
1923 establishments in North Dakota